Norman Hillman Bartold (August 6, 1928 – May 28, 1994) was an American film and television actor. He played Mr. Brody in eight episodes of the American television sitcom Teachers Only. He also played the District Attorney Donahue in the short-lived television series Adam's Rib.

Bartold appeared in numerous television programs including The Streets of San Francisco, Benson, The Mary Tyler Moore Show, Fantasy Island, Too Close for Comfort, Charlie's Angels, Perfect Strangers and Night Court. He also appeared in a few episodes of Laverne & Shirley, Mr. Belvedere, Barney Miller, The Rockford Files and Falcon Crest. Bartold died in May 1994 in Rancho Mirage, California, at the age of 65.

Filmography

Film

Television

References

External links 

Rotten Tomatoes profile

1928 births
1994 deaths
Male actors from Berkeley, California
American male television actors
American male film actors
20th-century American male actors